The 2020 International Gymnix competition was the 29th edition of the International Gymnix competition. It was held in Montreal, Canada from March 6-8.

Medal table

Results

References

External links
  Official site

International Gymnix
2020 in Canadian sports
2020 in Quebec